The Wicklow Senior Football Championship is an annual Gaelic Athletic Association competition organised by Wicklow GAA between the top Gaelic football clubs in County Wicklow, Ireland. The winner of the Wicklow Championship qualifies to represent their county in the Leinster Senior Club Football Championship, the winner of which progresses to the All-Ireland Senior Club Football Championship. The current (2022) champions are St. Patrick's (15th title), who defeated Baltinglass by 1-10 to 1-08 on October 9th 2022 at the county grounds in Aughrim.

Top winners
1888 title shared by Annacurra & Clara

Roll of honour

References

 (1931) Annacurra won the first match but Hollywood objected. Annacurra then won the 'replay'.
 (1951) Carnew won on the day but Donard won on appeal as Carnew had played a suspended player in the final.

External links
Official Wicklow Website
Wicklow on Hoganstand
Wicklow Club GAA

 
Gaelic football in County Wicklow
Senior Gaelic football county championships
Wicklow GAA club championships